
NVC community U6 (Juncus squarrosus - Festuca ovina grassland) is one of the calcifugous grassland communities in the British National Vegetation Classification system.

It is a comparatively localised community. There are four subcommunities.

Community composition

The following constant species are found in this community:
 Sheep's Fescue (Festuca ovina)
 Heath Rush (Juncus squarrosus)
 Common Haircap Polytrichum commune 
 Bifid Crestwort Lophocolea bidentata sensu lato

One rare species is associated with the community, Greater Pawwort, Barbilophozia lycopodioides.

Distribution

This community is found locally in the uplands of Wales, northern England and Scotland.

Subcommunities

There are four subcommunities:
 the Sphagnum spp. subcommunity
 the Carex nigra - Calypogeia trichomanis subcommunity
 the Vaccinium myrtillus subcommunity
 the Agrostis capillaris - Luzula multiflora subcommunity

References

 Rodwell, J. S. (1992) British Plant Communities Volume 3 - Grasslands and montane communities  (hardback),  (paperback)

U06